Seyyed Mohsen Kharazi (born in 1937 in Tehran) is a member of the Assembly of Experts of the Islamic Republic of Iran.  He was a candidate for the 4th Assembly of Experts.

See also
 List of Ayatollahs

References & notes

External links

1937 births
Living people
Iranian Islamists
Iranian ayatollahs
People from Tehran
Shia Islamists
Members of the Assembly of Experts
Society of Seminary Teachers of Qom members
Ali Khamenei